Eupithecia silenicolata is a moth in the family Geometridae. It is found from southern Europe (southern France, central Italy and the Balkan Peninsula) and Morocco to western Asia (Turkey, Russia and the Caucasus), Iran and Pakistan. In the north, the range extends to southern Switzerland, Austria and northern Italy.

The wingspan is about 22 mm. Adults are on wing from May to June and again from July to August in two generations per year.

The larvae feed on Silene species which are related to Silene nutans, especially Silene paradoxa. The species overwinters in the pupal stage.

Subspecies
Eupithecia silenicolata silenicolata
Eupithecia silenicolata perdistincta Wehrli, 1933 (Lebanon)
Eupithecia silenicolata soultanabadi Brandt, 1941 (Iran)
Eupithecia silenicolata zengoensis Fazekas, 1979

References

Moths described in 1867
silenicolata
Moths of Europe
Moths of Asia
Moths of Africa
Taxa named by Paul Mabille